Melapalayam is a state assembly constituency in Tirunelveli district, Tamil Nadu, India. It exists from 1967 to 1971.

Members of Legislative Assembly

Election results

1971

1967

References

External links
 

Tirunelveli district
Former assembly constituencies of Tamil Nadu